Aliaksei Shostak (born February 8, 1995) is an American trampoline gymnast. He represented the United States at the 2020 Summer Olympics.

Gymnastics career

National competition
Shostak has competed at six USA Gymnastics Championships. In 2014 he won silver in the synchro competition with Jeffrey Gluckstein. In 2015 he won bronze in the synchro competition with Gluckstein. In 2016 he won bronze in the synchro competition with Gluckstein. In 2017 he won gold in the synchro competition with Gluckstein. In 2018 he won silver on trampoline. In 2019, he won silver on trampoline.

International competition
In October 2015, Shostak competed at the 2015 World Cup, where he won bronze in the synchro competition with Jeffrey Gluckstein. In May 2016, he competed at the 2016 Shanghai World Cup, where he won bronze in the synchro competition with Gluckstein. In July 2017, he competed at the 2017 World Games, where he finished in fifth place in the synchro competition. 

In October 2018, he competed at the 2018 Loule World Cup. In April 2019, he competed at the 2019 Minsk World Cup, where he finished in fourth place in the synchro competition. In June 2021, he competed at the 2021 Brescia World Cup where he won bronze in the synchro competition with Gluckstein.

Shostak has represented the United States at six World Championships. At the 2019 Trampoline Gymnastics World Championships, he finished in fifth place in the synchro competition, and won silver in the team all-around. As the top American finisher at the 2019 World Championships, he was named to team USA at the 2020 Summer Olympics. The games were postponed until 2021, where Shostak competed but did not qualify for the finals.

References

External links
 

Living people
1995 births
American male trampolinists
Gymnasts at the 2020 Summer Olympics
Olympic gymnasts of the United States
Belarusian emigrants to the United States